Wanaku (Aymara and Quechua for guanaco,  also spelled Huanaco) is a  mountain in the Bolivian Andes. It is located in the Chuquisaca Department, Azurduy Province, Tarvita Municipality. Wanaku lies south of Wanaku Kimray, northwest of the village of Panti Pampa.

References 

Mountains of Chuquisaca Department